Les Annales du théâtre et de la musique (The Annals of Theatre and Music) was an annual French periodical which covered French dramatic and lyric theatre for 42 years, from 1875 to 1916. The volumes also covered concert series and necrology. A total of 41 volumes were published.

Substantial prefaces were contributed by, among others, Émile Zola (1878), Victorin de Joncières (1880), Émile Perrin (1882),  Charles Garnier (1883), Charles Gounod (1885), Jules Barbier (1886), Henri Meilhac (1889), Ludovic Halévy (1890), Émile Faguet (1897), Albert Carré (1899), Catulle Mendès (1902), Camille Saint-Saëns (1904), Jean Richepin (1905), Maurice Donnay (1908), Robert de Flers (1911), and Léon Blum (1912).

References

1876 establishments in France
1918 disestablishments in France
Defunct magazines published in France
Magazines established in 1876
Magazines disestablished in 1918
Magazines published in Paris
French-language magazines
Music criticism
Music magazines published in France
Theatre magazines
Annual magazines